Gaimersheim is a municipality in the district of Eichstätt, in Bavaria, Germany. It is situated 7 km northwest of Ingolstadt.

Mayors
 1946–1960: Sebastian Schiebel (CSU)
 1960–1984: Martin Meier (SPD)
 1984−2008: Anton Knapp (CSU) 
 since 2008: Andrea Mickel (SPD)

References

Eichstätt (district)